Love for Sale is the second studio album by Euro-Caribbean group Boney M. The album includes the hits "Ma Baker" and "Belfast". It also includes covers: "Love for Sale" (by Cole Porter), "Have You Ever Seen the Rain?" (by Creedence Clearwater Revival), and "Still I'm Sad" (by The Yardbirds). It has been released on vinyl, cassette and later on CD.

Artwork
The standard cover art features the male member Bobby Farrell "naked [with] a futuristic golden thong" chaining female members, resembling African sexual slaves. American label Atlantic Records found the cover "raunchy", so they used the standard back cover of a vinyl sleeve featuring the band wearing clothes as the alternative front cover of American and Canadian edition. One of the female group members, Liz Mitchell, told The Sydney Morning Herald:They wanted to photograph us all totally naked in chains with [band member Bobby Farrell] standing over us like it was bondage[...] I wept—trust me. When they showed us the costumes, it was just heavy gold chains.

The front cover of the South Korean vinyl edition features the band in one live performance, and the back cover of the edition features the band in a studio photo session.

Track listing
Side A
 "Ma Baker" (Frank Farian, Fred Jay, George Reyam (Hans-Jörg Mayer)) – 4:36
 "Love for Sale" (Cole Porter) – 4:47
 "Belfast" (Jimmy Bilsbury, Drafi Deutscher, Joe Menke) – 3:31
 "Daddy Cool" (U.S. edition only) from the previous album Take the Heat off Me – 3:27
 "Have You Ever Seen the Rain?" (John Fogerty) – 2:40
 "Gloria, Can You Waddle" (Frank Farian, George Reyam) – 3:57

Side B
 "Plantation Boy" (Fred Jay, King) – 4:27
 "Motherless Child" (Frank Farian, Liz Mitchell) – 4:58
 "Silent Lover" (Frank Farian, Keith Forsey, Fred Jay) – 4:14
 "A Woman Can Change a Man" (Frank Farian, Fred Jay) – 3:33
 "Still I'm Sad" (Jim McCarty, Paul Samwell-Smith) – 4:34

Personnel
 Liz Mitchell – lead vocals (tracks A2, A4, B1, B2, B4, B5), backing vocals
 Marcia Barrett – lead vocals (tracks A3, B3), backing vocals
 Frank Farian – lead vocals (A5), backing vocals
 Linda Blake – voice of "Ma Baker" on A1
 Bill Swisher – speaker voice on A1
 The Rhythm Machine – musicians
 Gary Unwinn – bass guitar
 Keith Forsey – drums
 Todd Canedy – drums
 Nick Woodland – guitar
 Johan Daansen – guitar
 Thor Baldursson – keyboards
 The Black Beautiful Circus – performers on tracks A5 and B5

Production
 Frank Farian – producer
 Stefan/Stephen Klinkhammer – arranger, conductor
 Christian Kolonovits – arranger
 Johann Daansen  – arranger
 Thor Baldursson  – arranger
 Fred Schreier – sound engineer
 Hartmut Pfannmüller – sound engineer
 John Lund – sound engineer
 Michael Lammert – sound engineer
 Recorded and mixed at Union Studios, Munich, and Europe Sound Studios, Offenbach .

Charts

Weekly charts

Year-end charts

Certifications and sales

Reissued
 1994: CD, BMG, 74321 21270 2
 2007: CD, Sony BMG Music Entertainment, 88697082612
 2011: Boney M. Original Album Classics, 5 CD, Sony Music, 88697928702
 2017: Boney M. Complete, 9 LP, Sony Music, 88985406971

References

External links 
 Rate Your Music, detailed discography
 Discogs.com, detailed discography
 [ Allmusic, biography, discography etc.]

1977 albums
Boney M. albums
Albums produced by Frank Farian
Atlantic Records albums
Hansa Records albums